Freudenberger is a German surname. Notable people with the surname include:

 Herbert Freudenberger (1927–1999), German-born American psychologist
 Nell Freudenberger (born 1975), American novelist
 Schraga Har-Gil (1926–2009), born Paul-Philipp Freudenberger, German-Israeli journalist and writer
 Sigmund Freudenberger (1745–1801), Swiss painter

German-language surnames
Jewish surnames
Yiddish-language surnames